The Southern Utah Thunderbirds men's basketball team is the men's basketball team that represents Southern Utah University in Cedar City, Utah. The school's team currently competes in the Western Athletic Conference. The Thunderbirds are coached by Todd Simon.

Postseason

NCAA Division I Tournament results
The Thunderbirds have appeared in the NCAA tournament once, as tournament champions of the Mid-Continent Conference in 2001. Seeded fourteenth in the East regional, Southern Utah was eliminated in the first round, falling by three points to the third seed, seventh-ranked Boston College.

CBI results
Southern Utah has appeared in one CBI tournament. Their record is 1–0.

CIT results
Southern Utah has appeared in one CollegeInsider.com Postseason Tournament (CIT). Their record is 1–1.

The Basketball Classic results
Southern Utah has appeared in one The Basketball Classic Tournament. Their record is 3–1.

NAIA Tournament results
The Thunderbirds appeared in the NAIA tournament once and lost their opening game.

Coaching records

References

External links
 

 
1963 establishments in Utah
Basketball teams established in 1963